Hydrolycus tatauaia is a species of dogtooth characin found in the Amazon, Orinoco and Essequibo basins in tropical South America. Adults mainly occur in deep and/or fast-flowing rivers. It is migratory, moving upstream to breed in November–April.

Like other Hydrolycus species, H. tatauaia has long pointed canine teeth that are used to spear their prey, generelly smaller fish. The body and head are silvery, and there is a vertically elongated dark spot behind the opercle. The tail is reddish to orange. The species name tatauaia is of Tupi origin and means "fire tail".

This predatory fish occasionally makes its way into the aquarium trade, but it requires a very large tank.

References

Cynodontidae
Freshwater fish of Brazil
Freshwater fish of Colombia
Fish of Guyana
Fish of Venezuela
Fish of the Amazon basin
Taxa named by Naércio Aquino de Menezes
Fish described in 1999